Raija Tellervo Sollamo (née Pursula; born December 9, 1942 in Padasjoki) is a Finnish theologian and professor emerita of Biblical Languages in the Faculty of Theology, University of Helsinki. She was the first female professor in the field of theology in Finland. Between 1998 and 2003, Sollamo was vice-rector of the University of Helsinki, thereby becoming the first female vice-rector in Finland. From 2007 to 2010, she was president of The International Organization for the Study of the Old Testament (IOSOT).

Awards and recognition
Sollamo has received numerous awards and accolades: the Academy of Finland Doctoral Thesis Award (1980), the University of Helsinki Eino Kaila Award (1992), elected Woman of the Year (social influence) by the Finnish business and Professional Women Association (1993), the Maikki Friberg Equality Prize (1996), and the Alfred Kordelin Foundation Award (2014). Since 2002, she is an honorary member of the Finnish Exegetical Society and since 2006 a member of the Finnish Academy of Sciences.

Books 
 Harviainen, Tapani & Sollamo, Raija (eds): Heprean tekstikirja ja sanasto. Helsinki: Gaudeamus, 1973 (3rd ed., 1978). .
 Sollamo, Raija: Renderings of Hebrew Semiprepositions in the Septuagint. AASF 19 (PhD diss.). Helsinki: Suomalainen Tiedeakatemia, 1979. .
 Aejmelaeus, Anneli & Sollamo, Raija (eds): Studien zur Septuaginta-Syntax: Ilmari Soisalon-Soininen zu seinem 70. Geburtstag am 4. Juni 1987. AASF B 237. Helsinki: Suomalainen tiedeakatemia, 1987. .
 Sollamo, Raija: Raamatun naisia. Helsinki: Kirjaneliö, 1983. .
 Sollamo, Raija (ed.): Kuolleen meren kirjakääröt: Qumranin tekstit suomeksi. Helsinki: Yliopistopaino, 1991. .
 Sollamo, Raija & Dunderberg, Ismo (ed.): Naisia Raamatussa: Viisaus ja rakkaus. Helsinki: Yliopistopaino, 1992. .
 Sollamo, Raija (ed.): Paimentolaisten uskonnosta kirkkolaitokseksi. Suomen eksegeettisen seuran julkaisuja 55. Helsinki: Suomen eksegeettinen seura, 1991 (2nd ed., 1993). .
 Sollamo, Raija: Repetition of the Possessive Pronouns in the Septuagint. Septuagint and cognate studies series 40. Atlanta, GA: Scholars Press, 1995. .
 Sollamo, Raija (ed.): Qumranin kirjasto: Valikoima teoksia. Helsinki: Yliopistopaino, 1997. .

References 

1942 births
Living people
Academic staff of the University of Helsinki
Finnish theologians
People from Padasjoki
Finnish scientists